Elzie may refer to:

 Elzie Buck Baker (1919–2002), American stock car racer
 Elzie Buddy Baker (1941–2015), American NASCAR driver and sports commentator, son of Buck Baker
 LZ Granderson (born 1972), American journalist and columnist
 E. C. Segar (1894–1938), American cartoonist, creator of Popeye
 Johnetta Elzie, American civil rights activist
 Elzie Odom (1929), American politician
 Pat Elzie (born 1960), American-German professional basketball coach and former professional player

See also
 Elsie (disambiguation)

Masculine given names